Ralph J. Yarro is founder/CEO and chairman of ThinkAtomic, Inc. an early stage venture accelerator and incubator of technology firms. He was previously chairman of the board and the largest shareholder in The SCO Group, Inc. and CEO of The Canopy Group, Inc.

From 1995 to 2004 he worked directly with Ray Noorda as part of the Noorda family companies, ultimately serving as president and CEO of The Canopy Group, Inc. He supported and/or served as chairman, board member, or trustee of many of these companies, including: Altiris, Angel Partners, Arcanvs, Center/7, Caldera, Cogito, ClearStone, Cerberian, DeviceLogics, Direct Pointe, Digital Harbor, Data Crystal, Expressware, Embedix, Fat Pipe, Geolux, Helius, iArchive, Janus Logix, Keylabs, Learning Optics, Lineo, Linux Networx, Luxul, Maxstream, MTI, Mediphis, MyFamily.com, Net Schools, Nombas, North Face Learning, Perimeter Labs, Planet Earth Tools, Profit Pro, Power Innovations, Smart Bomb, Surf China, Traxess, Troll Tech, ViaWest, Vintela, Vinca, Vultus, WrenchHead, Willows, and many more. His SCO holdings amount to about 5.621 million shares, or about 31.4% of SCO's common stock.

Yarro holds a BA in political science from Brigham Young University.

SCO/Canopy lawsuit 
In 2004–2005, Yarro was involved in a lawsuit. Yarro was fired for cause from his job as director of the Canopy Group, along with two other Canopy executives, Darcy Mott (who had been the chief financial officer) and Brent Christensen (who had been the corporate counsel), by the founders Raymond and Lewena Noorda. Yarro, Mott, and Christensen sued Canopy for US$100,000,000, claiming they were "illegally ousted" by a group led by Val Noorda Kreidel, Raymond Noorda's daughter.

The Canopy Group (now run by William Mustard) countersued, claiming that Yarro had misappropriated $20,000,000.00 by "a series of self-dealing and wasteful transactions." On March 8, 2005, the day before initial hearings, the suit was settled. The private settlement resulted in Yarro gaining all of The Canopy Group's shares in The SCO Group, that Yarro, Mott, and Christensen would be paid an undisclosed sum of money, and that they had ceased to hold any interest in Canopy and had resigned from all positions there.

CP80 
As of 2006, Yarro spends most of his time fighting internet pornography with CP80. He is pushing for state legislation to move all mature content to a different port than the standard HTTP port 80. On March 13, 2007, Utah Gov. Jon Huntsman Jr. held a ceremonial signing of House Concurrent Resolution 3, which urged the U.S. Congress to pass stricter anti-Internet pornography legislation.

The CP80 foundation, a long time Internet pornography foe, was directly involved with the legislation. Its Internet pornography solution is part of the resolution.

In April 2004, Yarro has been pushing for extending the legislation making ISPs responsible for content on open wireless access ports.  The plan is to give tax incentives to ISPs who co-operate and volunteer as "community-protectors".  It has not been made clear who exactly sets the standards and who stands to benefit from deployment of approved technical filtering and a rating system.  According to the Deseret News Article, Utah ISP representatives, such as XMission owner Pete Ashdown, are opposed to restricting their operations while their out of state competitors aren't restricted. In the same article, Ashdown also questioned why local ISPs should be  singled out when other local businesses, such as local hotels, can freely show porn on adult channels.

Yarro's Law 
Starting in 2003, Yarro sponsored the development of a bill that would bring IP laws in the state of Utah current with those similar to California's. Attorneys and political experts were hired by Yarro to help develop the bill. A state bill (S.B. 239) making intellectual property laws stricter, titled "The Unfair Competition Law", S.B 239 cleared the Utah legislature approval in the
spring of 2004.

S.B. 239 has been applied retroactively by SCO's attorneys to the Santa Cruz – IBM Monterey agreement in the SCO vs IBM case. The same bill has also been cited as by SCO's attorneys in the SCO vs Novell litigation.

Political contributions 
Yarro has contributed money for the election committee of Senator Orrin Hatch (R, Utah), and for the election of Christopher Cannon (R, Utah).  On one occasion, six separate contributions from six different people sharing the last name "Yarro" (First names: Ralph, Jackie, Riley, Tanner, Noah, Sydney) to Senator Orrin Hatch were made on August 30, 2006. On March 9, 2007, Yarro contributed to Mitt Romney's presidential campaign. After Romney dropped out Yarro contributed to John McCain's presidential campaign.

References

External links
Forbes profile

Living people
Businesspeople from Utah
SCO–Linux disputes
Year of birth missing (living people)